Fujifilm X-H2S is a 26-megapixel mirrorless camera produced by Fujifilm. The X-H2S, which will be positioned as more similar to a pro DSLR than anything else in the X-series, is the company's latest high-speed flagship model. It is the successor of the X-H1 from 2018 and will be available for $2,499 on July 7, 2022.  

The X-H2S will have a ProRes internal, ProRes RAW, and BRAW external recording. It will be the first digital camera to incorporate the 26.16-megapixel X-trans CMOS 5 HS imaging sensor, which is both stacked and backside-illuminated, allowing it to read data four times faster than Fujifilm's previous X-Trans CMOS 4 sensor.

Fujifilm X-H2 is a 40.2-megapixel mirrorless camera with the same form factor as the X-H2S.

Features 

 A modern PSAM dial replacing the traditional shutter speed and ISO dials. 
 Improved speed, autofocus tracking capabilities, and hybrid video shooting 
 26-megapixel backside-illuminated APS-C layered construction.
 3" A fully articulating 1.62 million-dot LCD
 5.76 million-dot EVF with 0.8x magnification
 New Autofocus system
 ,Enhanced Prediction Method to improve Zone AF performance created using Deep Learning technology
 6.2K 30p video recording of 4:2:2, 10-bit Apple ProRes HQ, ProRes 422, ProRes LT, and ProRes 422 Proxy 
 4K 120p video recording of 4:2:2, 10-bit h.265  
 Full HD 240p
 1/180s sensor readout speed reducing visual effects of rolling shutter
 FAN-001 optional external cooling fan available
 F-Log2 providing 14+ stops of dynamic range
 Large grip, top-facing LCD display, and a heavy-duty body
 Dual memory card slots: SD and CFexpress Type B

References

External links 

 

X-H2S
Cameras introduced in 2022